Ryu Hye-young (born March 28, 1991) is a South Korean actress and model. She is best known for her role in the hit drama series Reply 1988 (2015-2016) and Law School (2021).

Filmography

Film

Television series

Awards and nominations

References

External links 

 

1991 births
Living people
South Korean film actresses
South Korean television actresses
Actresses from Seoul
Konkuk University alumni
21st-century South Korean actresses